Anguran (also Romanized as Angūrān and Angooran; also known as Angūru) is a village in Kohurestan Rural District, in the Central District of Khamir County, Hormozgan Province, Iran. At the 2006 census, its population was 200, in 44 families.

References 

Populated places in Khamir County